Operation Gold (also known as Operation Stopwatch by the British) was a joint operation conducted by the American Central Intelligence Agency (CIA) and the British MI6 Secret Intelligence Service (SIS) in the 1950s to tap into landline communication of the Soviet Army headquarters in Berlin using a tunnel into the Soviet-occupied zone. This was a much more complex variation of the earlier Operation Silver project in Vienna.

The plan was activated in 1954 because of fears that the Soviets might be launching a nuclear attack at any time, having already detonated a hydrogen bomb in August 1953 as part of the Soviet atomic bomb project. Construction of the tunnel began in September 1954 and was completed in eight months. The Americans wanted to hear any warlike intentions being discussed by their military and were able to listen to telephone conversations for nearly a year, eventually recording roughly 90,000 communications. The Soviet authorities were informed about Operation Gold from the very beginning by their mole George Blake but decided not to "discover" the tunnel until 21 April 1956, in order to protect Blake from exposure.

Some details of the project are still classified and whatever authoritative information could be found was scant, until recently. This was primarily because the then-Director of Central Intelligence (DCI), Allen Dulles had ordered "as little as possible" be "reduced to writing" when the project was authorized. In 2019, additional specifics became available.

Background
After the Red Army followed the Soviet diplomatic department, and transferred its most secure communications from radio to telephone landline, the post-World War II Western Allies lost a major Cold War source of information. Operation Gold was hence at least the third tunnel built to aid intelligence in the Cold War period post the end of World War II. From 1948 onwards under Operation Silver, British SIS had undertaken a number of such operations in then still occupied Vienna, the information from which enabled the restoration of Austrian sovereignty in 1955. The KGB later commissioned the Red Army to construct a tunnel to tap into a cable that served the major US Army garrison for Berlin.

Operational agreement
In early 1951, the CIA undertook an assessment process for replacing lost Soviet radio communications intelligence. Revealing their plans to the British, the SIS, having read the report which included the idea of tapping Soviet telephone lines, revealed the existence of Operation Silver in Vienna.

On the reassignment of CIA agent Bill Harvey to Berlin to explore available options, Reinhard Gehlen, the head of the Bundesnachrichtendienst, alerted the CIA to the location of a crucial telephone junction, less than  underground, where three cables came together close to the border of the American sector of West Berlin. Operation Gold was planned jointly by the SIS and the CIA. Initial planning meetings were held at No. 2 Carlton Gardens, London, from which the West German government were excluded, due to the "highly infiltrated nature" of their service. The resulting agreement was that the US would supply most of the financing and construct the tunnel (as the closest access point was in their sector), whilst the British would use their expertise from Operation Silver to tap the cables and provide the required electronic communications equipment.

One of those who attended the early meetings was George Blake, a mole in the British intelligence apparatus. Blake apparently alerted the KGB immediately, as two of Gehlen's agents were caught trying to get a potential tapping wire across a Berlin canal. The KGB decided to let Operation Gold proceed since, in order to attack the tunnel, the Soviets would have to compromise Blake and they found it preferable to sacrifice some information rather than their valuable agent. According to the author of a 2019 book about the operation, the Soviets "value[d] Blake so much, they fear[ed] his exposure more than they fear[ed] a breach of their secrets".

The KGB did not inform anyone in Germany, including the East Germans or the Soviet users of the cables, about the taps. According to a CIA report, "there were no known attempts to feed disinformation to the CIA". Although the British SIS suspected the opposite, the CIA report states that "the Soviet military continued to use the cables for communications of intelligence value".

Construction
In December 1953 the operation was placed under the direction of William King Harvey, a former U.S. Federal Bureau of Investigation (FBI) official who transferred to the CIA. Captain Williamson of the United States Army Corps of Engineers was placed in charge of construction.

The first project was the construction of a "warehouse", which acted as a disguise for a US Army ELINT station. Digging the initial vertical shaft for the tunnel began on 2 September 1954 and was completed on 25 February the following year.

Using a shield method of construction, which pushed forward on hydraulic rams, the resultant space was lined with sand and 1,700 cast-iron lining plates. A wooden railway track acted as a guide for the rubber-wheeled construction vehicles, which by end of construction had removed  of material. This included a number of evacuations, including when the diggers broke through into an undocumented pre-World War II cesspool and flooded the tunnel. Throughout all stages of construction and in operational use, the entire tunnel was rigged with explosives, designed to ensure its complete destruction. Once complete, the tunnel ran into the Altglienicke area of the Treptow borough, where British Army Captain Peter Lunn—a former alpine skier, who was actually the head of the SIS in Berlin—personally undertook the tapping of the three cables. The British also installed most of the electronic handling equipment in the tunnel, which was manufactured and badged as British made.

The final cost of the completed tunnel was over US$6.5M, or equivalent to the final procurement cost of two Lockheed U-2 spy planes.

Operations

The tunnel ran 1,476 feet and was six feet in diameter and operated for 11 months and 11 days according to a 2019 book by Washington Post journalist Steve Vogel, who reviewed all of the available documents and interviewed 40 of the project's participants. Betrayal in Berlin: The True Story of the Cold War's Most Audacious Espionage Operation includes a "virtually month-by-month account of the tunnel’s excavation and operation", according to one review. As well, after that book was published, the CIA released a less redacted version of their documents about the tunnel.

Inside, the British and the Americans listened and recorded the messages flowing to and from Soviet military headquarters in Zossen, near Berlin: conversations between Moscow and the Soviet embassy in East Berlin and conversations between East German and Soviet officials.

The West was unable to break Soviet encryption at this time. Instead they took advantage of valuable intelligence gained "from unguarded telephone conversations over official channels."  "Sixty-seven thousand hours of Russian and German conversations, were sent to London for transcription by a special section staffed by 317 Russian emigres and German linguists. Teleprinter signals, many of them multiplexed, were also collected on magnetic tape and forwarded to Frank Rowlett's Staff D for processing."

To protect Blake, the KGB was forced to keep the flow of information as normal as possible with the result that the tunnel was a bonanza of intelligence collection for the US and Britain in a world that had yet to witness the U-2 or satellite imagery.

According to Budiansky, "The KGB's own high-level communications went on a separate system of overhead lines that could not be tapped without its being obvious, and, concerned above all with protecting Blake as a valuable source inside SIS and unwilling to share its secrets with rival agencies, the KGB had simply left both the GRU and the Stasi in the dark about the tunnel's existence."

Discovery by the Soviets

When Blake received a transfer in 1955, the Soviets were free to "discover" the tunnel. On 21 April 1956, months after the tunnel went into operation, Soviet and East German soldiers broke into the eastern end of the tunnel. One source indicates that the wiretap had been in service for roughly 18 months. The Soviets announced the discovery to the press and called it a "breach of the norms of international law" and "a gangster act". Newspapers around the world ran photographs of the underground partition of the tunnel directly under the inter-German frontier. The wall had a sign in German and Russian reading "Entry is Forbidden by the Commanding General."

In the planning phase, the CIA and SIS had estimated that the Soviets would cover-up any discovery of the tunnel, through embarrassment and any potential repercussions. However, most world media portrayed the tunnel project as a brilliant piece of engineering. The CIA may have gained more than the Soviets did from the "discovery" of the tunnel. In part, this was because the tunnel was discovered during Soviet First Secretary Nikita Khrushchev's state visit to the United Kingdom, and specifically the day before a state banquet with HM Queen Elizabeth II at Windsor Castle. It is suspected that the Soviets and the British agreed to mute media coverage of British participation in the project even though the equipment shown in most photographs was British-built and clearly labelled as such.

Only in 1961, when Blake was arrested, tried and convicted, did Western officials realize that the tunnel had been compromised long before construction had begun. Although DCI Allen Dulles has publicly celebrated the success of Operation Gold in providing order of battle and other information about Soviet and East Bloc activities behind the Iron Curtain, a declassified NSA history implied that NSA may have thought less of the value of the tunnel collection than did the CIA.

In 1996 the Berlin city government contracted a local construction company to excavate approximately 83 meters from the former American Berlin sector of the tunnel to make way for a new housing development.
In 1997 a 12 meter section was excavated under the guidance of William Durie from what had been the Soviet Berlin sector. This section of tunnel is displayed at the Allied Museum. The museum’s claim that this section was retrieved from the American sector is false.
The CIA museum received outer tunnel shell elements in 1999 and the International Spy Museum in Washington thereafter.

Postscript; When the tunnel was entered by East German Forces on the evening of the 21st of April, 1956: THE RED CENTER went immediately to GREY. Please note that all communications (including 'paper order') associated with TANK, became 'wireless rig'. GCHQ (so called) had 'a field day'; principally during the 1956 East German 'summer exhibition' (both with Hungary and SUEZ in the background and the introduction of T-55; about to break: 'in open order'): given that encrypted 'line communication' was still conducted in restored ENIGMA (until 1973/74 and the release of the reference work; The Ultra Secret). Please note; that 'the operational set' was TANK REGIMENT/TANK CORPS/NAVAL DIVISION/BRITISH NAVY: based both in Bovington Camp, Dorset and Old Dalby, Leicestershire. The order was HENRIETTA/WHITE LION/BRAMCOTE/NOTTINGHAMSHIRE. Quote: Two pints of larger and a packet of crisps, please. 
Reference: Mr.D.J.WALL. ICI

In fiction
Operation Gold forms the background to the novels The Innocent by Ian McEwan, Voices Under Berlin: The Tale of a Monterey Mary by T.H.E. Hill and to the film The Innocent by John Schlesinger.

Notes

References 
 
 David Stafford, Spies Beneath Berlin – the Extraordinary Story of Operation Stopwatch/Gold, the CIA's Spy Tunnel Under the Russian Sector of Cold War Berlin, Overlook Press, 2002. 
 David E. Murphy, Sergei A. Kondrashev, George Bailey. Battleground Berlin: CIA vs. KGB in the Cold War, Yale University Press, 1999. 
 CIA Clandestine Services History Paper (CSHP) number 150, "The Berlin Tunnel Operation", 1968
 Rory MacLean, Berlin: Imagine a City / Berlin: Portrait of a City Through the Centuries, Weidenfeld & Nicolson / Picador 2014.

External links

 
 Turning a Cold War Scheme into Reality – Engineering the Berlin Tunnel, www.cia.gov
 The Berlin Tunnel, article at The Cold War Museum
 The International Spy Museum, located in downtown, Washington, DC at 800 F Street, NW, has a Berlin tunnel exhibit

Gold
Operation Gold
Gold
Operation Gold
Soviet Union–United Kingdom relations
Soviet Union–United States relations
1956 in international relations
Clandestine operations
Tunnels in Berlin